Football is one of the most popular sports, both in terms of participants and spectators, in Seoul. Seoul had several of South Korea's leading football clubs and biggest football stadium - Seoul World Cup Stadium.

History

In 1902, establishment of football team at Paichai Academy in Seoul (currently Paichai High School FC), There was a footballing boom throughout the Korea. that saw many football clubs and school teams formed by the 1910s. Also in Seoul, many famous football clubs like Bulgyo Cheongnyeonhoe (불교청년회, Buddhist Youth Club), Geongang Gurakbu (건강구락부, Health Club) and Joseon Football Culb (조선축구단) were founded between the 1910s and 1920s, and they usually had a rivalry against football clubs in Pyongyang, the second biggest city in Korea. In 1933 Kyungsung FC, named according to Seoul's alternate name, was formed and it was the only Korean club which won the Emperor's Cup in Japan.

Clubs

Current clubs
 Men's Football   

 Women's Football

Defunct clubs 
 Not Franchised Period 1983–1986 : K League Clubs had franchise but clubs played the all game of round at one stadium.
 Franchised Period 1987–present : K League introduced home and away matches system in 1987.

[1]
The board of K League forced the three clubs Ilhwa Chunma, LG Cheetahs and Yukong Elephants out of the city in 1996.  
Therefore, Seoul's 3 clubs had to leave Seoul for another city in accordance with the K League's decentralization policy and relocated not their own wills as below:. 
Ilhwa Chunma relocated to Cheonan, LG Cheetahs to Anyang and Yukong Elephants to Bucheon.

Honours
※ Only counted FC Seoul 1990–1995 seasons, 2004–present in Seoul franchise / Ilhwa Chunma (Currently Seongnam FC) 1989–1995 seasons in Seoul franchise / Yukong Elephants (Currently Jeju United) 1991–1995 seasons in Seoul franchise.

Domestic
 League Title

 League Cup

 FA Cup

 National Football Championship

International
 AFC Champions League

Women's Domestic

Seoul derbies 
The Seoul derbies started in 1990, with competing three football clubs: Ilhwa Chunma, LG Cheetahs and Yukong Elephants also participated in 1991. This derby was called Dongdaemun derby and first derby proper in K League. Many Korean football fans called Dongdaemun Derby because three clubs used Dongdaemun Stadium as their home together.
The highlight match of the derbies was the K League 28-round match between Ilhwa Chunma and Yukong Elephants at Dongdaemun Stadium on 9 November 1994.
This match was also famous for both teams' great goalkeepers: Valeri Sarychev of Ilhwa Chunma and Aleksandr Podshivalov of Yukong Elephants from Lev Yashin Club.
Yukong Elephants beat Ilhwa Chunma 2–0 in this round, and took the derby with a one-point difference.
The Seoul derbies stopped in 1995, due to the board of K League forcing the three original clubs out of the city in 1996.

Seoul Dongdaemun derby 
Dongdaemun derby was consisted of Ilhwa Chunma vs. LG Cheetahs,  Yukong Elephants vs. Ilhwa Chunma, LG Cheetahs vs Yukong Elephants in Dongdaemun Stadium

This derby was put to an end in 1996, due to K League's decentralization policy which relocated the 3 clubs.

Ilhwa Chunma vs LG Cheetahs (1990–1995)

Ilhwa Chunma vs Yukong Elephants (1991–1995)

LG Cheetahs vs Yukong Elephants (1991-1995)

Seoul Gangnambuk derby

FC Seoul vs Seoul E-Land FC 
Seoul E-Land FC was newly founded on April 15, 2014. This club will use Seoul Olympic Stadium in South Seoul (Gangnam). Korean football fans hope to Seoul derby with FC Seoul using Seoul World Cup Stadium in North Seoul (Gangbuk).

The first meeting between the two clubs occurred On 14 April 2021, FA Cup 3 Round
Seoul E-Land FC won 1–0 at Seoul World Cup Stadium

Derbies with clubs not based in Seoul

Kyungsung-Pyongyang Football Match

Super Match

Gyeongin derby 

  FC Seoul vs Incheon United
 As of 15 September 2019
 Penalty shoot-outs results are counted as a drawn match.

Stadiums
 Seoul World Cup Stadium
 Seoul Olympic Stadium
 Mokdong Stadium
 Hyochang Stadium
 Dongdaemun Stadium

Notable footballers

Players
 Lee Young-jin
 Yoon Sang-chul
 Hong Myung-bo
 Yoo Sang-chul
 Kim Eun-jung
 Cho Won-hee
 Lee Chung-yong

Managers
 Şenol Güneş

Administration
Seoul is the location of the headquarters of Korea Football Association.

See also 
 K League
 Korean League Cup
 Korean FA Cup
 Korean Super Cup
 AFC Champions League
 Korean National League
 Challengers League
 Korean football league system
 List of football clubs in South Korea

References 

 K League HISTORY 1990 season

External links
 Official website of Seoul Football Association